Roberto Simanowski (born 1963) is a German scholar of literature and media studies and founder of dichtung-digital.
 
Simanowski studied German literature and history at the University of Jena where he finished his PhD on mass-culture around 1800 with a grant by the German Studienstiftung in 1996. He worked 1997 and 1998 in the research center Nationality of International Literatures at the University of Göttingen, conducted his research project Cyberspace and Literature with a stipend from the German Humboldt-Foundation at Harvard University 1998 until 2000, was visiting scholar at the University of Washington in Seattle 2001 until 2002, and served as guest professor at the department of media studies at the University of Jena in 2002/2003. Simanowski was a professor of German literature and culture as well as digital aesthetics at Brown University in Providence, Rhode Island (2003-2010), and professor of media studies at the University of Basel in Switzerland (2010-2013) and at City University of Hong Kong (2014-2017). In 1999 he founded the online-journal dichtung-digital.org, a Journal of art and culture in digital media, that he edited until 2014 when it contained about 450 contributions by over 100 scholars and artists from 20 countries. Simanowski works as author and media consultant in Berlin and Rio de Janeiro and is currently Distinguished Fellow of Global Literary Studies am Excellence-Cluster "Temporal Communities" at Freie Universität Berlin. His book Todesalgorithmus. Das Dilemma der künstlichen Intelligenz (Wien: Passagen Verlag 2020) received the Tractatus Award for best philosophical essay in German in 2020.

Book Publications 
 
Digitale Revolution und Bildung. Für eine zukunftsfähige Medienkompetenz (Digital Revolution and Education. Towards a sustainable media literacy), Weinheim: Beltz 2021, 103 pp. ISBN 978-3-7799-6511-4
Das Virus und das Digitale, Wien: Passagen Verlag 2021, 133 pp. ISBN 978-3-7092-0463-4
Todesalgorithmus. Das Dilemma der künstlichen Intelligenz, Wien: Passagen Verlag 2020 (Tractatus award for best philosophical essay in German in 2020). 
Sozialmaschine Facebook. Dialog über das politisch Unverbindliche, together with Ramón Reichert, Berlin: Matthes & Seitz 2019,  
The Death Algorithm and Other Digital Dilemmas, Cambridge, MA, London: MIT Press 2018 (CHOICE Award for outstanding                                        academic titles 2019), 
Waste. A New Media Primer. Cambridge, MA: MIT Press 2018. 
Facebook Society. Losing Ourselves in Sharing Ourselves. New York: Columbia University Press 2018.  
Stumme Medien – Vom Verschwinden der Computer in Bildung und Gesellschaft. Berlin: Matthes & Seitz 2018. 
Digital Humanities and Digital Media. Conversations on Politics, Culture, Aesthetics, and Literacy. London: Open Humanities Press 2016.  
 Data Love. The Seduction and Betrayal of Digital Technologies. Columbia University Press 2016.   
 Textmaschinen - Kinetische Poesie - Interaktive Installation. Zum Verstehen von Kunst in digitalen Medien, Bielefeld: Transcript 2012. 
 Digital Art and Meaning. Reading Kinetic Poetry, Text Machines, Mapping Art, and Interactive Installations, University of Minnesota Press 2011. 
 Reading Moving Letters: Digital Literature in Research and Teaching. A Handbook (Mitherausgeber), Bielefeld: Transcript 2010. 
 Digitale Medien in der Erlebnisgesellschaft. Kultur - Kunst - Utopien [Digital Media in the Society of Event: Culture, Art, Utopia], Reinbek bei Hamburg: Rowohlt, 2008.
 Transmedialität. Studien zu paraliterarischen Verfahren [Transmediality. On Para-literary Procedures] (Coeditor), Göttingen: Wallstein-Verlag 2006.
 Interfictions. Vom Schreiben im Netz [Interfictions. Writing in the Net], Frankfurt am Main: Edition Suhrkamp 2002.
 Literatur.digital. Formen und Wege einer neuen Literatur [Literature Digital. Present and Future of a New Literature] (Editor), Deutscher Taschenbuch Verlag 2002.
 Digitale Literatur [Digital Literature] (Coeditor), Text & Kritik: Nr. 152/October 2001.
 Europa - ein Salon? Beiträge zur Internationalität des literarischen Salons [The Internationality of the Literary Salon: Contributions to an Historical Typology] (Coeditor, Göttingen: Wallstein Verlag 1999.
 Kulturelle Grenzziehungen im Spiegel der Literaturen: Nationalismus, Regionalismus, Fundamentalismus [Drawing Cultural Borders in the Mirror of Literature: Nationalism, Regionalism, Fundamentalism] (Coeditor), Göttingen: Wallstein Verlag 1998.
 Die Verwaltung des Abenteuers'. Massenkultur um 1800 am Beispiel Christian August Vulpius [Administration of Adventure: Mass-Culture around 1800], Göttingen: Vandenhoeck & Ruprecht 1998.

References

External links 
 Roberto Simanowski's Homepage
 dichtung-digital. journal for contributions on digital aesthetics
 CityU Faculty

1963 births
German literary critics
German non-fiction writers
Living people
University of Jena alumni
Harvard University people
University of Washington faculty
Brown University faculty
Literature educators
German male non-fiction writers
Electronic literature critics